Fantastic Five is a fictional superhero team appearing in American comic books which were published by Marvel Comics. The team exists in the MC2 Universe, an alternate future to the Marvel Universe. A continuation of the Fantastic Four, the team was originally composed of the Human Torch, his wife Ms. Fantastic/Lyja (a Skrull), the Thing, Big Brain (Reed Richards' remote-controlled robotic body), and Psi-Lord (Franklin Richards, Sue and Reed's son).

Fictional team biography

The Fantastic Five first appeared in What If (Volume 2) #105 (1998), an issue that focused on Spider-Girl, the daughter of Spider-Man. Spider-Girl became popular and was given her own series, along with the other characters in the MC2 universe (including the Fantastic Five). The Fantastic Five's series lasted only five issues, but they remained recurring characters in the Spider-Girl title, which lasted for 100 issues in its first volume. A new Fantastic Five mini-series was published in 2007, after the success of two mini-series events set in the MC2 line.

In the first series, it was revealed that "Big Brain" is a drone controlled from the Negative Zone, where Sue Storm is held in a kind of stasis. Her powers are holding back a breach in reality, and Reed is at her side.  When this problem is corrected, Reed and Sue returned to Earth.

The team also appears in Last Hero Standing and Last Planet Standing.

In Spider-Girl and Last Planet Standing, additional children of the original Fantastic Four are shown as members of the Fantastic Five, including Super-Storm (Torus Storm, son of Lyja and Johnny Storm, who possesses the powers of both parents), Grim (Jacob "Jake" Grimm, son of Ben Grimm, stuck in a rock-like yet strong form like his father), and Rad (Alyce Grimm, daughter of Ben Grimm, twin sister of Jacob, appears to have radiation-oriented powers, including flight). Doom, aka Kristoff Vernard, is also shown to be a member of the "young" Fantastic Five; he wears Doctor Doomlike armor

A five-issue mini-series called Fantastic Five was published. It features such characters as: Psi-Lord, Invisible Woman, Thing, Sharon Ventura, Human Torch, Ms. Fantastic (Lyja Storm), Mr. Fantastic, and Dr. Doom.

Doom, imprisoned for years by the Sub-Mariner, finally breaks free, and imbues countless robotic duplicates with the Power Cosmic. Just one robot manages to decimate the Five and destroy Ben's robotic implants. Although the team manages to stop the robot by trapping it in a stasis beam, the real Doom appears and banishes the younger members to a spaceship orbiting earth, and trapping the others within Mr. Fantastic's own rubbery body. Franklin has the others remove the inner shielding of the ship, and exposes himself to a massive amount of cosmic rays, which increases his powers dramatically. He manages to destroy the Doombot guarding them but is greatly pained by using his increased powers. Doom, seeking to humble Reed once and for all, has the other freed from his body, and has Reed and himself plugged into an Infinity Device for a mental duel, the loser of which will have his mind sent to the Crossroads of Infinity. Reed's teammates use the opportunity to escape, and with Kristoff's help, shut down the cosmically powered Doombots. Reed and Doom are shown to be evenly matched in their duel, and both minds are sent to the crossroads as a result, leaving their bodies blank and motionless. Sue and Kristoff decide to remain in Latveria and look after Reed, while Alyce goes home with her mother. Ben's son Jacob takes Reed's place in the F5.

Roster

Active
Johnny Storm, the Human Torch - While Reed and Sue were in the Negative Zone, Johnny took command of the team. On their return, however, Johnny would clash with Reed over leadership techniques, even considering whether to form his own team.
Ben Grimm, the Thing - Badly injured in a final battle with Terrax, Ben was outfitted with mechanical implants. Recently, his injured flesh has shown signs of regeneration.
Lyja Storm, Ms. Fantastic - Johnny's wife, a member of the shape-shifting Skrull race.
Franklin Richards, Psi-Lord - Son of Reed and Sue, and master of telepathy and telekinesis. After absorbing a large amount of cosmic radiation, his head now has the appearance of a glowing skull, and he must wear a helmet to protect others from the excess energies.
Jacob Grimm, Grim - The son of Ben Grimm and Sharon Ventura, he is similar in appearance to his father, and also possesses his strength levels. He joins the F5 in Reed's absence.

Former
Sue Storm, the Invisible Woman - Badly injured during a battle with Hyperstorm, she too was occupied in the Negative Zone until recently. She decides to remain in Latveria and care for her catatonic husband.
Alyce Grimm, Rad - Jacobs sister, she is able to control and project Cosmic Radiation. She decides to forgo the superhero life and returns home with her mother.
Torus Storm, Super-Storm - Johnny and Lyja's young son. Not an actual member of the team, but he insists on leaping into the fray whenever he can. He has his father's fire powers and his mother's shape-shifting abilities. In battle, he regularly takes the form of an older version of himself wearing an F5 uniform with a "6" on its chest.

Other versions
What If..? #1 is set in an alternative universe where Spider-Man joins the Fantastic Four (rather than leaving when he learns there isn't a salary, as happened in The Amazing Spider-Man #1), and they become the Fantastic Five. This universe is revisited in What If..? #21, by which time Susan Storm has left the team and chosen to marry Namor of Atlantis.
What If..? (vol. 2) #27 showed Namor joining the Fantastic Four, briefly making it the Fantastic Five until Reed Richards left to found Richards Technology.
In Exiles #44, the Weapon X team—led by Hyperion—began their conquest of the actual world they were on, by killing its superhero teams. At the beginning of the issue, they began killing the members of the Fantastic Five, which consisted of Mister Fantastic, the Invisible Woman, the Human Torch, the Thing, and Spider-Man as a fifth member.
In Excalibur (vol. 1) #51, the Fantastic Five was the Earth-99476 counterpart of the Fantastic Four, consisting of dinosaur versions of the Fantastic Four and Spider-Man.
"The All New Fantastic Five?!?" also appears in Spider-Girl #87. Co-creator Tom DeFalco states that the new F5 were to appear in Fantastic Five #6 had the series continued.
Fatal Five - Due to Seth's return to action, Spider-Girl and American Dream travel to an alternate universe that was last seen in A-Next #11 to recruit Thunderstrike. During their trip, they encounter an evil version of the Fantastic Five consisting of:
Reed Richards (he and that world's Baron Zemo first appeared in A-Next #10-11 as assistants to Victor von Doom)
Johnny Storm/Blow Torch
Ben Grimm/The Brute
Franklin Richards/Psi-Slayer
Peter Parker/The Spider

References

Bibliography
Fantastic Five #1–5 (October 1999 – February 2000)
Last Hero Standing #1–5 (June – July 2005)
Spider-Girl #86-88 
Last Planet Standing #1–5 (July – September 2006)
Brief bios of Fantastic Five characters at Spider-Girl/MC2 fansite
Fantastic Five (vol. 2) #1-5 (July 2007-November 2007)

Fantastic Four
Marvel Comics titles
Marvel Comics 2
Marvel Comics superhero teams